The 2008 Asian Beach Volleyball Championships (8th tournament) was a beach volleyball event, that was held from 3 to 6 April 2008 in Hyderabad, India.

Medal summary

Participating nations

Men

  (2)
  (2)
  (5)
  (2)
  (2)
  (2)
  (1)
  (2)
  (2)

Women

  (2)
  (2)
  (4)
  (1)
  (2)
  (1)
  (2)
  (1)
  (2)

Men's tournament

Winners table

Losers table

7th place

5th place

Medal round

Women's tournament

Winners table

Losers table

7th place

5th place

Medal round

References

External links
 Final Ranking

Asian Championships
Beach volleyball
Beach volleyball
Asian Beach Volleyball Championship